Delmorad Bazar (also Romanized as Delmorād Bāzār; also known as Ḩāj Del Morād Bāzār and Ḩājj Del Morād Bāzār) is a village in Polan Rural District, Polan District, Chabahar County, Sistan and Baluchestan Province, Iran. At the 2006 census, its population was 356, in 70 families.

References 

Populated places in Chabahar County